Bidessini is a tribe of predaceous diving beetles in the family Dytiscidae. There are at least 40 genera and at least 630 described species in Bidessini.

Genera
This is a list of 40 genera in the tribe Bidessini.
 Africodytes Biström, 1988
 Allodessus Guignot, 1953
 Amarodytes Régimbart, 1900
 Anodocheilus Babington, 1841
 Bidessodes Régimbart, 1900
 Bidessonotus Régimbart, 1895
 Bidessus Sharp, 1882
 Borneodessus Balke, Hendrich, Mazzoldi and Biström, 2002
 Brachyvatus Zimmermann, 1919
 Clypeodytes Régimbart, 1894
 Comaldessus Spangler & Barr, 1995
 Crinodessus K. B. Miller, 1997
 Fontidessus K. B. Miller and Spangler, 2008
 Geodessus Brancucci, 1979
 Gibbidessus Watts, 1978
 Glareadessus Wewalka and Biström, 1998
 Hemibidessus Zimmermann, 1921
 Huxelhydrus Sharp, 1882
 Hydroglyphus Motschulsky, 1853
 Hypodessus Guignot, 1939
 Kakadudessus Hendrich and Balke, 2009
 Leiodytes Guignot, 1936
 Limbodessus Guignot, 1939
 Liodessus Guignot, 1939
 Microdessus Young, 1967
 Neobidessodes Hendrich and Balke in Hendrich, Hawlitschek and Balke, 2009
 Neobidessus Young, 1967
 Neoclypeodytes Young, 1967
 Pachynectes Régimbart, 1903
 Papuadessus Balke, 2001
 Platydytes Biström, 1988
 Pseuduvarus Biström, 1988
 Sharphydrus Omer-Cooper, 1958
 Sinodytes Spangler, 1996
 Tepuidessus Spangler, 1981
 Trogloguignotus Sanfilippo, 1958
 Tyndallhydrus Sharp, 1882
 Uvarus Guignot, 1939
 Yola Gozis, 1886
 Yolina Guignot, 1936

References

Bibliography

 D.J. Larson, Y. Alarie, and R.E. Roughley. (2001). Predaceous Diving Beetles (Coleoptera: Dytiscidae) of the Nearctic Region, with emphasis on the fauna of Canada and Alaska. NRC 43253.
 Nilsson, Anders N. (2001). World Catalogue of Insects, volume 3: Dytiscidae (Coleoptera), 395.

Further reading

 Arnett, R. H. Jr., and M. C. Thomas. (eds.). (21 December 2000) American Beetles, Volume I: Archostemata, Myxophaga, Adephaga, Polyphaga: Staphyliniformia. CRC Press LLC, Boca Raton, Florida. 
 
 Richard E. White. (1983). Peterson Field Guides: Beetles. Houghton Mifflin Company.

External links

 NCBI Taxonomy Browser, Bidessini

Dytiscidae